The National Corps, also known as the National Corps Party, and previously called the Patriots of Ukraine, is a far-right political party in Ukraine founded in 2016 and then led by Andriy Biletsky. Before his involvement with Azov, Biletsky also founded and led two other far-right parties, the Social-National Assembly and the Patriot of Ukraine. The party was created by veterans of the Azov Battalion and members of the Azov Civil Corps, a civilian non-governmental organization affiliated with the Azov Battalion.

During its campaign for the 2019 Ukrainian parliamentary election, the party formed a united radical right nationwide-party list with the Governmental Initiative of Yarosh, the Right Sector, and Svoboda. This coalition won a combined 2.15% of the nationwide electoral list vote but ultimately failed to win any seat in the Verkhovna Rada.

History
On October 14, 2016, 292 delegates from across Ukraine attended the founding congress of the party in Kyiv. The party was previously registered as the "Patriots of Ukraine". The congress unanimously elected Andriy Biletsky, a member of the Verkhovna Rada, as the party's leader, elected Commander Nazariy Kravchenko of the Azov National Guard Headquarters as the deputy leader, and appointed members of the party's ruling council. The congress also approved changes to the party's charter and political programme.

The congress concluded with a "Nation March", which it organized with the Right Sector, a like-minded far-right organization with close ties to the National Corps. About 5,000 people took part in the torch-lit march from the Motherland Monument located in the National Museum of the History of Ukraine in the Second World War to Saint Sophia's Square. Some of the marchers wore or carried the yellow and blue symbol of the Azov Battalion, which resembles the Wolfsangel, a symbol associated with Nazism. October 14 is celebrated as the Defender of Ukraine Day, as a public holiday in Ukraine since 2015.

In 2018, Olena Semenyaka became the international secretary of the party.

In November 2018, the National Corps refused to support Ruslan Koshulynskyi and his campaign for the 2019 Ukrainian presidential election, and instead decided to nominate its own leader, Andriy Biletsky, as the common candidate of the Ukrainian nationalist camp. However, in late January 2019, Biletsky ruled out his participation in the presidential elections, and stated that he would concentrate all efforts "to bring our numbers to 50,000 people", and pledged to spearhead a successful campaign for the 2019 Ukrainian parliamentary election.

In 2019, the Ukrainian government gave over 8 million hryvnias for "national-patriotic education projects” targeting Ukrainian youth, of which $30,000 "apparently" was allocated to several right-wing groups including National Corps.

As part of its campaign for the 2019 Ukrainian parliamentary election, the National Corps formed a nationwide united party list with Svoboda, the Governmental Initiative of Yarosh, and the Right Sector. However, the resulting coalition only managed to win 2.15% of the popular vote, and since the coalition failed to pass the 5% threshold, it ultimately received no representation in the Verkhovna Rada. In addition, the National Corps also failed to win any single-mandate constituency seat.

In the 2020 Ukrainian local elections the party gained 23 deputies (0.04% of all available mandates).

Policies and ideology

As of 2016, the National Corps advocated for expanding the role of the head of state by granting the President of Ukraine absolute authority to become the Supreme Commander-in-Chief of the Armed Forces of Ukraine as well as the Prime Minister of Ukraine, ultimately supporting a transition towards a fully presidential system.

As of 2016, the National Corps favoured the restoration of Ukraine's nuclear power status, and also support the re-nationalization of enterprises and industries formerly owned by the Ukrainian SSR upon Ukraine's declaration of independence in 1991. The party wants Ukraine to become a neutral country. The National Corps are staunchly opposed to Russia and its foreign policy, and they strongly support  breaking off all diplomatic, economic and cultural ties with Russia. The party also opposes the entry of Ukraine into the European Union, and is vocally opposed to fostering closer ties with NATO. In addition, the National Corps favours the creation of a new Intermarium superstate, which would hypothetically comprise the entirety of Ukraine, Belarus, Poland, Lithuania, Latvia, Estonia, 
the Czech Republic, and Slovakia. The party also advocates the expansion of the right to bear arms and a public referendum regarding the restoration of capital punishment for treason and the embezzlement of government funds. The party is strongly opposed to the rights of Romanians in their old historical regions, currently located in Ukraine (Northern Bukovina, Northern Bessarabia, Budjak and Hertsa region). The National Corps support economic nationalism and protectionism, oppose free trade and the Transatlantic Trade and Investment Partnership (TTIP) and also supports the cultivation of Ukraine's domestic industry and exports.

In 2018, Ihor Vdovin, a spokesman for the militia wing, told The Guardian that the National Corps are not neo-Nazis and did not want to establish a white supremacist state, although he admitted that some members hold white supremacist or neo-Nazi views. The party's leader Andriy Biletsky had previously made racist statements, such as his 2010 speech calling on "the white races of the world into a final crusade against Semite-led [Jews] Untermenschen [subhumans]", but has subsequently "toned down his rhetoric" denying being anti-Semitic and expressing support for Israel.

Election results

Verkhovna Rada

Presidential elections

See also
 Azov Battalion
 Far-right politics in Ukraine

References

External links
Official website 

Eurosceptic parties in Ukraine
2016 establishments in Ukraine
Far-right political parties in Ukraine
Political parties established in 2016
Far-right politics in Ukraine
National conservative parties
Social conservative parties
Right-wing populist parties
Anti-Romanian sentiment